The Avoca River is a river in the southern Hawke's Bay region of New Zealand. It flows southeast through farmland to meet the Tukipo River at A'Deanes Reserve.

References

Rivers of the Hawke's Bay Region
Rivers of New Zealand